Kalamaki beach, known as Kapelas, is located 6 km west of Ierapetra, near the Nea Anatoli in Crete.

It is a quiet beach with fine sand and shallow waters. The beach is a few known mainly to locals, because is hidden from the road by tall cliffs and greenhouses that exist around it.

Kalamaki is an attendance area for turtles Caretta caretta.

References
Kalamaki - Mesara stigmes.gr
Kalamaki ierapetra.net
Ammoudares Beaches cretanbeaches.com

Beaches of Crete
Landforms of Lasithi